Tehanu , initially subtitled The Last Book of Earthsea, is a fantasy novel by the American author Ursula K. Le Guin, published by Atheneum in 1990. It is the fourth novel set in the fictional archipelago Earthsea, following almost twenty years after the first three Earthsea novels (1968–1972), and not the last, despite its subtitle.
It won the annual Nebula Award for Best Novel and the Locus Award for Best Fantasy Novel.

Tehanu continues the stories of Tenar, the heroine of the second book of the Earthsea series The Tombs of Atuan, and Ged, the hero of the first book, A Wizard of Earthsea.

Plot Summary 
Tehanu begins slightly before the conclusion of the previous book in the series, The Farthest Shore, and provides some information about the life of Tenar after the end of The Tombs of Atuan. She had rejected the option of life in aristocratic Havnor, and instead arrived on Gont. For some time she lived with Ged's old master, the mage Ogion – but though fond of him, rejected Ogion's offer to teach her magic. Instead, she married a farmer called Flint with whom she had two children, called Apple and Spark, and became known to the locals as Goha. It is mentioned that Ged was a bit disappointed in – and did not understand – Tenar's choice of a life.

At the book's outset her husband is now dead and her children grown up. Tenar lives on her own at Flint's property – Oak Farm – and is lonely and uncertain of her identity. She is brought a severely injured child, born of wandering vagabonds; the child's natural father had pushed her into a campfire and left her for dead. Tenar helps to save the child's life, but the child is left with one side of her face permanently scarred and the fingers of one hand fused into a claw. Tenar adopts her and gives the child the use name Therru, which means "flame" in Tenar's native Kargish language.

Tenar learns that Ogion is on his deathbed and has asked to see her. She sets out to visit him at his house outside the town of Re Albi, taking Therru with her. On the way, she encounters a group of ruffians, one of whom is Handy, who was involved in the original attempt on Therru's life, and claims to be her uncle. She stays with Ogion, tending to him in his last days. He instructs her to teach Therru, but his instructions are vague, and hint at her being more than she seems. After his death, she stays on at his cottage, assisted by a local witch called Moss and a simple village girl called Heather. A few days after Ogion's death, Ged (also called Sparrowhawk) arrives on the back of the dragon Kalessin, unconscious and near death. Ged – once the Archmage of Roke – has spent all his wizard's powers in sealing the gap between the worlds of the living and the dead created by the evil wizard Cob. She nurses him back to health, but when the new king Lebannen sends envoys to bring him back to Havnor for the coronation, Ged cannot face them. He accepts Tenar's offer to return to Oak Farm to manage things there in her absence and once more takes up life as a goatherd. While at Re Albi, Tenar is confronted by the local lord's wicked mage, Aspen, who attempts to put a curse on her, but is initially thwarted.

Tenar informs the king's men that she cannot reveal Ged's whereabouts, and they accept the situation and depart. Tenar is initially unsure whether to stay or leave Re Albi, but when she is threatened by both Aspen and Handy, she flees with Therru. Her mind confused by Aspen's magic, she is almost overtaken by Handy, but manages to escape to Gont Port, taking refuge in the ship of the king himself. Lebannen takes Tenar and Therru to Valmouth, where Tenar eventually returns to Oak Farm to find that Ged is away tending goats in the mountains for the season. Tenar settles back into life on the farm, until one night when Handy and a group of men attempt to break into the house. They are driven off by Ged, who followed them on their way toward the farm and nearly kills one of them with a pitchfork. Tenar and Ged begin a relationship, acknowledging that they had always loved each other. Ged wants nothing more than to settle down and live an ordinary life, far from the concerns of an Archmage. Together, they teach and care for Therru and manage the farm. The order is upset, however, when Tenar's son Spark returns home suddenly from a life as a sailor and tells her he wishes to run the farm. Under Gontish law Oak Farm belongs to him and Tenar has no claim to it.

Tenar receives word that Moss is dying and wants to see her. She, Ged and Therru leave immediately for Re Albi. However, the message was a trap set by Aspen, who reveals himself to be a follower of the defeated wizard Cob. Tenar and Ged are led to the lord's mansion controlled by Aspen's magic. Therru runs to the cliff behind Ogion's cottage, where she calls to the dragon Kalessin for help, and reveals her true nature: she is in fact "a double being, half human, half-dragon". Aspen and his followers bring both Tenar and Ged up to the clifftop. Under the influence of Aspen's spell, they are both just about to jump to their deaths when the dragon Kalessin arrives, subsequently burning Aspen and his men. Kalessin addresses Therru by her true name Tehanu, calling her its own daughter, and asks her if she would like to leave with it, but she decides for now that she will stay with Tenar and Ged. The novel ends with all three of them settling down to a simple life of farming and goat keeping at Ogion's old cottage.

Major characters

 Tenar  Former priestess of the Tombs of Atuan, and White Lady of Gont. Called Goha by the locals.
 Ged  Archmage of Roke. Called Sparrowhawk.
 Erisen  A twisted mage and follower of Cob.  Called Aspen.
 Kalessin  The eldest dragon.
 Tehanu  A burned child, a woman-dragon.  Called Therru.

Major themes

Gender issues

As in The Tombs of Atuan, Tehanu is written from a female perspective. The common saying quoted in "A Wizard of Earthsea" - "weak as a woman's magic, wicked as a woman's magic" - is shown to be untrue, an expression of narrow-minded male prejudice. The present novel makes clear that in fact women's magic is as strong as men's, the former being described by the witch Moss as being "deeper than the roots of trees, deeper than the roots of islands, older than the Making, older than the moon". Although it is less concerned with authority and dramatic action than male power, it is equally valuable. Wizards are portrayed as emotionally stunted, arrogant and detached. It is made explicit that wizards lead a life of celibacy to devote all their energy to their magic. These shortcomings are laid bare in Ged after he has lost his power. He is completely at sea and is described by Moss as having the emotions of a fifteen-year-old boy. He does not have the courage to face the King's men to tell them he can no longer be mage, and flees. He relies on Tenar to work out a solution for him, and find somewhere for him to recover his sense of identity. He goes back to being a goatherd. In so doing he reaches a new maturity and depth to his character, not available to him as Archmage. The dark wizard Aspen is portrayed negatively; his loathing of Tenar is plainly based on hatred and fear of her womanhood.

Le Guin's exploration in her fiction, particularly in Always Coming Home, of gender power issues had grown more overt in the years between the publication of The Farthest Shore in 1972 and Tehanu in 1990. Tehanu revisits the world of Earthsea with this sensibility and explores questions such as why women can't be wizards, why men are seen as superior to women in Earthsea, and what kind of power may be open to women if they are denied the power of wizardry.

Being and Doing

Following the Taoist thread running through the first three books and many of Le Guin's other works, a further theme in Tehanu is Ged's transition from a man of doing and action to a man of generally passive being in harmony with his feelings and with nature. This was foreshadowed in the first book of the trilogy, A Wizard of Earthsea, in the contrast between Ged's first teacher Ogion the Silent and Ged himself as a young student, and also in The Farthest Shore, at the end of which the Master Doorkeeper of Roke states of Ged: "He is done with doing: he goes home." This implies that Ged's full maturity lies not in doing but in "going home" to the part of himself that he has yet to embrace.

Magic

Magic in general has a much smaller role in Tehanu than in the previous trilogy. The book's text suggests that, to some extent at least, this is prompted by Le Guin's redefinition of the world of Earthsea and the questions she asks about the differences between male and female "power". In other words, the reduced emphasis on magic appears to be not just a difference in the kind of narrative Le Guin decided to tell, but in the actual role she felt that magic (as defined in the earlier trilogy) would play in the future of Earthsea.

Reception

The style of Tehanu differs from the initial Earthsea trilogy.  Where the initial trilogy was written around the classic fantasy tropes of perilous quests, heroic actions and larger-than-human forces, Tehanu studies social interaction and emotional resonance. The pace is slower, the mood darker and more introspective.

The initial trilogy focuses on the character and quests of Ged, with Tenar introduced as the central character of the second book. Tehanu uses the lens of everyday events and a strong anti-patriarchal viewpoint to not only explore the future of these two characters—and of Earthsea itself—but to reinterpret them. According to Sharada Bhanu, Le Guin sees this reinterpretation as a more balanced view of the world of Earthsea, which is written in the first three books from an implicitly patriarchal (or at least, male) viewpoint.

The Kirkus Reviews comments that "Yes, there are dragons; but the human story and its meaning are primary here. Unlike Ged's, Le Guin's power is undiminished." The review notes that Ged and Tenar are "past middle age", reflecting the slower action, but "even young readers will be beguiled by the flawless, poetic prose, the philosophy expressed in thoughtful, potent metaphor, and the consummately imagined world". The Science Fiction Review summarized the novel as "Great things happen to great people, whatever their station in life, and wherever they may be. An excellent story and a fine capstone to Earthsea."

Tehanu won the 1990 Nebula Award; this made Le Guin the first person to win three Nebula Awards for Best Novel. It also won the Locus Award for Best Fantasy Novel, and was nominated for the Mythopoeic Fantasy Award.

Notes

References

Sources

External links
 
 Tehanu: The Last Book of Earthsea at Worlds Without End

Earthsea novels
1990 American novels
1990 fantasy novels
American fantasy novels
Sequel novels
Nebula Award for Best Novel-winning works
Atheneum Books books